Brandon Sampson (born May 1, 1997) is an American professional basketball player for the Wisconsin Herd of the NBA G League. He played college basketball for Louisiana State University (LSU).

High school career
Sampson was named Louisiana Mr. Basketball as a senior for Madison Preparatory Academy in 2015 after averaging 15.9 points, 2.9 rebounds and 2.2 assists per game in leading the team to a state championship. He signed with coach Steve Lavin at St. John's, but reopened his commitment when Lavin was fired in 2015. He ultimately signed with hometown LSU.

College career
Sampson was part of a heralded LSU recruiting class for coach Johnny Jones, which also included future NBA players Ben Simmons and Antonio Blakeney. After a disappointing freshman season, which saw the Tigers underperform as a team and Sampson's minutes fluctuate, he found more consistency as a sophomore in the 2016–17 season. He averaged 11.6 points and 3.1 rebounds in 27.5 minutes per game, starting the majority of the season.

As a junior the following year, Sampson suffered a severe ankle sprain, which caused him to miss a month of the season. Upon his return, Sampson had difficulty with consistency due to the lingering effects of the injury. On the season, he averaged 7.7 points in 18.9 minutes per game.

Professional career
Following his junior season, Sampson declared for the 2018 NBA draft, but was not selected. After playing for the Atlanta Hawks in the 2018 NBA Summer League. He then signed an exhibit 10 contract with the Houston Rockets, who ultimately placed him on their NBA G League affiliate, the Rio Grande Valley Vipers. In 18 games with the Vipers, Sampson averaged 17.6 points, 4.8 rebounds and 3.9 assists per game.

On December 27, 2018, Sampson signed a two-way contract with the Chicago Bulls. Under the terms of the agreement, he would split time with the Bulls' G League affiliate, the Windy City Bulls. He was assigned and made his Windy City debut the next night, scoring 17 points and passing for 5 assists in a win. Sampson later made his NBA debut on January 30, 2019 with 5 points and 2 rebounds recorded in a 105–89 win over the Miami Heat.

On October 27, 2019, Sampson was included in the training camp roster of the Rio Grande Valley Vipers. He had a season high 27 points on January 13, 2020, additionally posting five rebounds and two assists in a win over the South Bay Lakers. In 42 games, Sampson averaged 13.2 points, 2.9 rebounds and 2.2 assists per game.

In 2020–21, Sampson played for the Delaware Blue Coats, appearing in 6 games in the pandemic-shortened season.

On October 26, 2021, Sampson joined the Iowa Wolves after a trade. In 30 appearances, he averaged 14.4 points, 3.7 rebounds, and 2.0 assists.

On April 12, 2022, Sampson signed with the Newfoundland Growlers of the CEBL.

Return to Iowa (2022–2023)
On November 2, 2022, Sampson was named to the opening night roster for the Iowa Wolves.

Wisconsin Herd (2023–present)
On February 24, 2023, Sampson was traded to the Wisconsin Herd.

Career statistics

NBA

Regular season

|-
| style="text-align:left;"| 
| style="text-align:left;"| Chicago
| 14 || 2 || 15.3 || .467 || .379 || .667 || 1.1 || .7 || .6 || .2 || 5.1
|- class="sortbottom"
| style="text-align:center;" colspan="2"| Career
| 14 || 2 || 15.3 || .467 || .379 || .667 || 1.1 || .7 || .6 || .2 || 5.1

References

External links
LSU Tigers bio
College stats @ basketball-reference.com

1997 births
Living people
American men's basketball players
American expatriate basketball people in Canada
Basketball players from Baton Rouge, Louisiana
Chicago Bulls players
Delaware Blue Coats players
Iowa Wolves players
LSU Tigers basketball players
Rio Grande Valley Vipers players
Shooting guards
Undrafted National Basketball Association players
Windy City Bulls players
Wisconsin Herd players